The Master international jiu-jitsu championship is a contest realized annually since 1996, in Tijuca Tênis Clube, in Rio de Janeiro. The event is open to all society. According to CBJJ, "the main goal is to stimulate elders athletes, in a specific contest, restoring the image of this sport which, when well taught, is very valuable in education, graduating men with moral characters".

Categories 
Belts: Blue, Purple, Brown, Black,  - Male and female.
The age is evaluated as the one the athlete completes in the year of the contest.
 Master 1:   30 to 35 years old
 Master 2 : 36 to 40 years old
 Master 3 : 41 to 45 years old
 Master 4 : 46 to 50 years old
 Master 5 : 51 to 55 years old
 Master 6 : 56 years old and elder.

Results

Available information 
Since 2004, CBJJ has broadcast the general result by teams.

2004 
 1° - Gracie Humaitá
 2° - Alliance - EOFC Integração
 3° - Gracie Barra

2005 
 1° - Brasa
 2° - Brazilian Top Team
 3° - Gracie Humaitá

2006 
 1° - Gracie Humaitá
 2° - Carlson Gracie
 3° - Gracie Barra

2007 
 1° - Gracie Humaitá
 2° - Brasa 
3° - UGF

2008 
 1- Gracie Humaita
 2- Alliance
 3- Brazilian Top Team

2009 
 1- Gracie Barra
 2- Gracie Humaitá
 3- Brazilian Top Team

2010 
 1- Gracie Humaita
 2- Gracie Barra
 3- Nova União

2011 
 1 - Gracie Humaitá
 2 - Nova União
 3 - Gracie Barra

See also 

 Brazilian Jiu-Jitsu
 Martial arts

References

External links
Official site of CBJJ
Master and Seniors International Jiu-Jitsu Championship 2011
Master and Seniors International Jiu-Jitsu Championship 2006
Jiu-Jitsu/MMA 2010

Brazilian jiu-jitsu competitions
Sports competitions in Rio de Janeiro (city)
Senior sports competitions